Christopher Kenneth Biggins (born 16 December 1948) is an English actor and television presenter.

Early life
Biggins was born in Oldham, Lancashire, the son of William and Pamela Biggins. He was brought up in Salisbury, Wiltshire, attended St Probus school where he took elocution lessons and participated in local drama groups. His first lead stage role was at the age of 17 in a Stage '65 production of Molière's Le Médecin malgré lui, leading to work with a local repertory theatre company.

Career

Television

One of Biggins' earliest roles was on Upstairs, Downstairs in Series 2, as the character Mr. Donaldson in the episode "An Object of Value" (1972). He appeared as the regular character Lukewarm in the situation comedy Porridge (1974–1977) starring Ronnie Barker. Other comedy shows he appeared in include Whatever Happened to the Likely Lads? (1973) and Some Mothers Do 'Ave 'Em (1973, 1978).

He played Nero in the BBC's version of I, Claudius (1976), dramatised from the novels by Robert Graves, having been selected for the role partly on the strength of a television commercial for Heineken in which he had played the Roman emperor Nero presiding over the games. He also appeared in the BBC's Poldark (1977) as the Reverend Osborne Whitworth, in Minder in the episode "The Bounty Hunter" (1979) and the TV miniseries Masada (1981).

On children's television, he had a regular role as department store owner Adam Painting in the children's television programme Rentaghost (1978–1983) and also played Reverend Whiting in Southern Television's Brendon Chase, produced in 1980. He had a leading role in The Phoenix and the Carpet (1997) and a supporting role as villainous antique dealer, Mr. Benger, in the Look and Read serial "Dark Towers" (1981).

Biggins' co-hosting of Surprise Surprise and hosting children's game show On Safari (1982–1984) for TVS,  led to his being typecast as a "bubbly personality". He was  asked in 2005 if he resented this situation replying:

He was the subject of This Is Your Life in 1999, when he was surprised by Michael Aspel at the Theatre Royal, Brighton.

He appeared in The One Doctor, one of Big Finish Productions' audio dramas based on the television series Doctor Who.

In 2003, Christopher appeared in Shed Productions programme Bad Girls as himself. He featured heavily in Episode seven where he was 'held hostage' by a group of prisoners protesting over the change of management in the prison. During the episode, he strikes up a relationship with many inmates, but one in particular, Buki Lester, whom he invites to live with him in episode fourteen of the same series.
2003 appeared in Jonathan Meades -‘Fast Food’

He took part in the seventh series of I'm a Celebrity...Me Out of Here! in 2007. He was eventually voted the winner of the show on 30 November 2007.

He took part in an episode of Celebrity Come Dine With Me, first shown on Channel 4 on 15 February 2009. He won £1,000 for his chosen charity.

In 2009, he played himself as a pantomime director in the BBC Two sitcom Psychoville.

In 2010, he was a celebrity guest team captain on an episode of What Do Kids Know? along with Rufus Hound, Joe Swash and Sara Cox on Watch. Also in 2010, he played God in the BBC adult puppet comedy show Mongrels.

In May 2011, he starred in the second series of Channel 4's Celebrity Five Go to... in which the celebrities visited South Africa.

In 2013, he appeared on The Celebrity Chase, where he was the first person in the history of the show to answer all 6 questions correctly while going for a higher offer.

In 2014, he took part in the celebrity cookery programme Celebrity MasterChef on BBC One, and returned again in 2020, for a Christmas Special. In 2014, he took part in a celebrity edition of Catchphrase. He voices It's Not Me, It's You on Channel 5.

On 28 July 2016, Biggins entered the Celebrity Big Brother house to participate in its eighteenth series. He was chosen by the public to take part in the first secret mission. He was removed from the house on Day 9. The show's producers stated that Biggins had made "a number of comments capable of causing great offence to housemates and the viewing public" with regard to antisemitic comments to his fellow housemates, as well as his view of bisexuals, whom he described as the "worst type" and blamed for the spread of HIV/AIDS. Forty-four people complained to Ofcom about comments Biggins made, but Ofcom ruled that he was not in breach of broadcasting rules.

Theatre

His theatre roles have included The Baker in Joseph and the Amazing Technicolor Dreamcoat, Herod in Jesus Christ Superstar, and 18 months at the London Palladium in the stage adaptation of Chitty Chitty Bang Bang (where he was teamed in a double act with Louise Gold).

In 2010, Biggins appeared as a guest star narrator in The Rocky Horror Show at various theatre venues in the United Kingdom.

Pantomime

Biggins has performed in pantomime. He has played Widow Twankey in Aladdin (in Plymouth in 2009, Grand Theatre, Wolverhampton in 2010), Buttons in Cinderella (at the Mayflower Theatre in Southampton in 2008) and the title role in Winnie the Pooh. In 2011, Biggins played the part of Mrs Crusoe in the Robinson Crusoe pantomime at the New Theatre, Cardiff and returned to the Theatre Royal, Plymouth in Dick Whittington in December 2012.

In December 2013, he was cast in the role of Dame Trot alongside Bob Carolgees in a production of Jack and the Beanstalk at New Theatre, Hull.

In 2014, he was in a production of Peter Pan as Mrs Smee in Southend, Essex.

In 2017, he received the Lifetime Achievement award at The Great British Pantomime Awards.

Film
His film roles include The Sex Thief (1973), Eskimo Nell (1975), It Could Happen to You (1975), The Rocky Horror Picture Show (1975), Adventures of a Plumber's Mate (1978), Derek Jarman's The Tempest (1979), and "The Baker" in the 1999 film Joseph and the Amazing Technicolor Dreamcoat.

In 2012, he was cast in the film version of Ray Cooney's farce Run for Your Wife.

Radio
In 2008, he briefly co-presented a Sunday morning radio show on BBC London with Lesley Joseph. In 2014 and 2015, Biggins covered for Liza Tarbuck on BBC Radio 2 while she was away.

In May 2017, he returned to BBC Radio 2 to cover for Paul O'Grady on his Sunday early evening programme.

Other work
Biggins hosts an annual show West End Live in London's Leicester Square.

In 2017 he recorded two songs for the album Wit & Whimsy – Songs by Alexander S. Bermange (one solo and one featuring all of the album's 23 artists).

Personal life
Biggins was married to Australian actress Beatrice Norbury from 1971 to 1974. He is now openly gay and formed a civil partnership with his partner, Neil Sinclair, on 30 December 2006 at Hackney Register Office.

Politically, Biggins has expressed his admiration for former Conservative Prime Minister Margaret Thatcher. He admits in his autobiography that he cried on the day she resigned, saying: "I'm not the most political of people. But I believe in self-reliance and getting on with the job in hand. Margaret had seemed to personify all that. And she had star quality, which of course I loved." In 2014, he said: "I loved John Major, he was charismatic and charming. I’ve always been a Conservative, though I would have voted for John Smith. I hope we have a new Conservative leader making his way to the top now. We need a new man."

During a 2012 interview on ITV's Loose Women, Biggins said that he felt same-sex marriage should not be legalised, stating that marriage "is for heterosexual couples". When same-sex marriage was introduced in England and Wales in 2014, Biggins attended the "I Do To Equal Marriage" event celebrating it.

References

External links

 
 
 Christopher Biggins On I'm A Celebrity
 
 Interview with What's On Wales

1948 births
Living people
English male radio actors
English male stage actors
English male television actors
English gay actors
I'm a Celebrity...Get Me Out of Here! (British TV series) winners
Pantomime dames
Male actors from Oldham
English LGBT actors
British LGBT broadcasters
Conservative Party (UK) people
LGBT conservatism
20th-century English LGBT people
21st-century English LGBT people